Chiangrai Lanna Football Club (Thai สโมสรฟุตบอลเชียงราย ล้านนา), is a Thai professional football club based in Mueang, Chiangrai, Thailand. The club is currently playing in the Thai League 3 Northern region.

History
In 2018, the club was established.

In 2019, the club began to compete in the 2019 Thailand Amateur League Northern region, using Chiangrai Provincial Stadium as the ground. At the end of the season, they have promoted to the 2020–21 Thai League 3.

In 2020, the club become a professional football club. Chiangrai Lanna competed in the Thai League 3 for the 2020–21 season. In late December 2020, the Coronavirus disease 2019 or also known as COVID-19 had spread again in Thailand, the FA Thailand must abruptly end the regional stage of the Thai League 3. The club has finished the 11th place of the Northern region. In the 2020 Thai League Cup, Chiangrai Lanna have competed for this tournament but they have defeated to Kamphaengphet in the first qualification round. However, the FA Thailand must cancel the Thai League Cup this year due to the spreading of COVID-19.

In 2021, the 2021–22 season is the second consecutive season in the Thai League 3 of Chiangrai Lanna. They started the season with a 1–0 home won over Nakhon Mae Sot United and they ended the season with a 1–2 away defeated to the Nakhon Mae Sot United. The club has finished tenth place in the league of the Northern region. In addition, in the 2021–22 Thai League Cup Chiangrai Lanna defeated 0–10 to Uthai Thani in the second qualifying round, causing them to be eliminated.

In 2022, the 2022–23 season is the third consecutive season in the Thai League 3 of Chiangrai Lanna and they have changed the club's logo this season.

Stadium and locations

Season by season record

P = Played
W = Games won
D = Games drawn
L = Games lost
F = Goals for
A = Goals against
Pts = Points
Pos = Final position

QR1 = First Qualifying Round
QR2 = Second Qualifying Round
R1 = Round 1
R2 = Round 2
R3 = Round 3
R4 = Round 4

R5 = Round 5
R6 = Round 6
QF = Quarter-finals
SF = Semi-finals
RU = Runners-up
W = Winners

Players

Current squad

References

https://m.facebook.com/443471939467239/posts/924282118052883/

External links
 Thai League official website

Association football clubs established in 2018
Football clubs in Thailand
Chiang Rai province
2018 establishments in Thailand